Rebecca Dean Petty (born April 13, 1970) is an American politician and activist. Her 12-year-old daughter was murdered in 1999, leading her to advocate for victims of violent crime from Rogers, Arkansas. She is also a Republican member of the Arkansas House of Representatives from the 94th district. The AR House district she represents encompasses a part of Benton County in the northwestern portion of Arkansas, her adopted state.

Background

Petty was born in Wichita, Kansas, and graduated in 1988 from Hatfield High School in Hatfield in Polk County, Arkansas, an institution which closed in 2005. Petty also attended Tulsa Community College in Tulsa, Oklahoma, dates not available, and earned a Bachelor of Science in Criminal Justice in 2013 from Arkansas Tech University at Russellville, at which she was an inductee of the Alpha Chi National College Honor Society. She since pursued a master's degree in leadership and ethics at the private John Brown University in Siloam Springs in Benton County. She lists her religious affiliation as a non-denominational Christian.

Career

From 2000 to 2008, Petty was the executive director of The Andi Foundation for Children. Since 2009, she has been a Crime Victim/Child Advocate consultant for the National Criminal Justice Training Center at Fox Valley Technical College in Appleton, Wisconsin. She is a founding member of the Surviving Parents Coalition, a group with fights child predators. Petty also works with the United States Department of Justice on training for Amber Alerts. She advocates "keeping our children safe from sexual predators by equipping our police with the tools they need to put criminals behind bars."

Petty is active in the Benton County Republican organization. In the low-turnout primary on May 20, 2014, she defeated Margaret "Marge" Wolf (born c. 1937), a former Wisconsin resident, a member of the Rogers City Council, and the president of the Northwest Arkansas Food Bank. Petty polled 878 votes (55.3 percent) to Wolf's 710 (44.7 percent). The House seat was vacated by the term-limited Debra Hobbs, who ran unsuccessfully for the Republican nomination for lieutenant governor; Hobbs was defeated by Tim Griffin, the former U.S. representative for Arkansas's 2nd congressional district. Petty carried the endorsement of State Senator Bart Hester of Cave Springs.

In the November 4 general election, Petty defeated the Democratic nominee, Grimsley Graham (born c. 1948), an English teacher at Rogers High School for thirty years, 3,508 votes (57.8 percent) to 2,565 (42.2 percent), in a heavily Republican year statewide and nationally.

Representative Petty holds these committee assignments:
 Vice-Chair of the House Judiciary Committee;
 Aging, Children and Youth, Legislative, and Military Affairs; and
 House Rules Committee.

In January 2015, Petty proposed legislation before the House Judiciary Committee to allow families of murder victims to witness the executions of the convicted criminals so as to gain some closure to their grief. The legislation passed both houses and was soon signed into law by Republican Governor Asa Hutchinson. The next month Petty proposed legislation to allow executions in Arkansas by firing squad.

Petty joined dozens of her fellow Republicans and two Democrats in co-sponsoring legislation in February 2015 submitted by Representative Lane Jean of Magnolia to reduce unemployment compensation benefits. The measure was signed into law by Governor Hutchinson.

The same month, she supported House Bill 1228—sponsored by Bob Ballinger of Carroll County—which sought to prohibit government from imposing a burden on the free exercise of religion. The measure passed the House seventy-two to twenty. One of the opponents, Representative Camille Bennett, a former city attorney for Lonoke, Arkansas, called for a reworking of the legislation. Bennett claimed the Ballinger bill would establish a "type of religious litmus test" which could impact nearly any law under consideration by the legislature. The measure was subsequently passed by a large margin in the House and signed into law in revised form, SB 975, by Governor Hutchinson.

References

1970 births
American activists
Anti-crime activists
Arkansas Tech University alumni
Child crime victim advocates
John Brown University alumni
Living people
Republican Party members of the Arkansas House of Representatives
People from Rogers, Arkansas
People from Wichita, Kansas
People from Tulsa County, Oklahoma
Tulsa Community College alumni
Women state legislators in Arkansas
21st-century American politicians
21st-century American women politicians